(also previously named Hiranoshima and Firando Island) is the 4th largest island in Nagasaki Prefecture. Its coasts are washed by Sea of Japan. The entire island and the part of the nearby Kyushu mainland is administered as part of Hirado city. The island's highest peak is Mount Yasumandake . Saikai National Park comprise 24% of the island's total area.

Geology
The Hirado island has formed as a horst elevated from the sea in Pliocene period. Its bedrock features a mixture of the sea sedimentary rocks of Tertiary period, mixed and overlaid by the recent Igneous rock. Due to being relatively young, the island is very hilly with large fraction of area over 200 meters elevation, and flat land is limited to marginal coastal plains. The coastline is highly indented and feature a large cliffs along the entire north-west coast facing East China Sea, except for river mouths.

History
The Hirado Island port was the primary departure point for the Japanese missions to Sui China and Japanese missions to Tang China in 7th-9th centuries.

16 October 1274, the Hirado Island was invaded by the detachment of the Mongol army as the part of Mongol invasions of Japan. During the 2nd invasion of 1281, the island was an important rear base for the Mongols until been abandoned after the invasion failed.

Since Muromachi period in 14th century, the island had become the hub for the Wokou pirates.
In the development of the Nanban trade with Europe, the Portuguese trade station was operational on the  island in 1550-1561 period. In 1584, the Spanish, British and Dutch traders   started visiting the island once again.

The Hirado Domain was established and Hirado Castle built under leadership of the  Matsuura clan in 1599. The castle was  razed in 1613 and re-built in 1704.

In 1609–1641, a Dutch trading factory was established in Hirado Island before been transferred to Dejima. From 1613, the ships of William Adams  started operating from  Hirado Island too, but the British trade mission was closed in 1623.

From 1955 to 2005, after a series of the municipal mergers, the Hirado city comprising the entire island was established.

Transportation
The Hirado Bridge over 570 meters wide strait connects the Hirado Island to the Kyushu. The bridge was completed in 1977 and the transit fee was cancelled in 2010. Also, Ikitsuki Bridge (completed in 1991) connects Hirado Island to the Ikitsuki Island. The island is served by the national Route 383. Ferries are available for transfer to the lesser inhabited islands nearby.

Climate
Hirado Island is located in the humid subtropical climate zone (Köppen Cfa), with four distinct seasons. The island rarely sees snowfall during the winter. Spring in Hirado Island starts off mild, but ends up being very humid. The summer tends to be Hirado's wettest season, with the  — the rainy season — occurring between early June (average:Jun.7) to late July (average:Jul.21). The island's weather is affected by the nearby  while being shielded from the warm Kuroshio Current by the Kyushu island, resulting in wetter and colder climate than should be expected at lower 30's latitudes. The climate of Hirado Island is greatly moderated by the surrounding sea, resulting in reduced seasonal and diurnal temperature variations.

Attractions
Saikai National Park
Hirado Castle

Notable residents

See also
Hirado, Nagasaki
Japanese cruiser Hirado
Hichiku dialect

References
This article incorporates material from Japanese Wikipedia page 平戸島, accessed 4 August 2017

Islands of Nagasaki Prefecture
Islands of the East China Sea